CBS 3 may refer to one of the following television stations in the United States:

Current

Owned-and-operated stations
KYW-TV in Philadelphia, Pennsylvania

Affiliated stations
KBJR-DT2, a digital channel of KBJR-TV in Duluth, Minnesota
KBTX-TV in Bryan/College Station, Texas
Semi-satellite of KWTX-TV in Waco, Texas
KEYT-DT2, a digital channel of KEYT-TV in Santa Barbara, California
KIFI-DT2, a digital channel of KIFI-TV in Idaho Falls, Idaho (cable channel, branded as Eyewitness News 3)
KIMT in Mason City, Iowa
KLEW-TV in Lewiston, Idaho
KMTV-TV in Omaha, Nebraska
KRTV in Great Falls, Montana
KTVO-DT2, a digital channel of KTVO in Kirksville, Missouri
WBTV in Charlotte, North Carolina
WCAX-TV in Burlington, Vermont
WCIA in Champaign Illinois
WFSB in Hartford, Connecticut
WRBL in Columbus, Georgia
WREG-TV in Memphis, Tennessee
WSHM-LD in Springfield, Massachusetts
WTKR in Hampton Roads, Virginia
WWAY-DT2, a digital channel of WWAY in Wilmington, North Carolina
WWMT in Grand Rapids, Michigan

Formerly affiliated 
KCDO-TV, Sterling, Colorado (1963 to 1999)
KDLH, Duluth, Minnesota (1955 to 2016)
KGMV, Wailuku, Hawaii (1955 to 2009)
Was a satellite of KGMB in Honolulu, Hawaii
KIDK, Idaho Falls, Idaho (1974 to 2021)
KIEM-TV, Eureka, California (1953 to 1985)
KREG-TV, Glenwood Springs, Colorado (1987 to 2017)
Was a satellite of KREX-TV in Grand Junction, Colorado
WJMN-TV in Escanaba/Marquette, Michigan (1992 to 2022)
Was a semi-satellite of WFRV-TV in Green Bay, Wisconsin